Mostafizur Rahman

Career
Rahman was elected to parliament from Noakhali-2 as a Jatiya Samajtantrik Dal candidate in 1986 and 1988.

Death 
Mostafizur Rahman died on 3 November 2013.

References

Jatiya Party politicians
Living people
3rd Jatiya Sangsad members
4th Jatiya Sangsad members
1986 births